
This is a list of ornithologists who have articles, in alphabetical order by surname. See also :Category:Ornithologists.

A

John Abbot – US
Clinton Gilbert Abbott – US
William Louis Abbott – US
Joseph H. Acklen – US
Humayun Abdulali – India
Jon E. Ahlquist – US
Prince Akishino (皇嗣秋筱宮文仁親王) – Japan
Luigi d'Albertis – Italy
John Warren Aldrich – US
Boyd Alexander – England
Christopher James Alexander – England
Horace Alexander – England, US
Wilfred Backhouse Alexander – England
Salim Ali – India
Arthur Augustus Allen – US
Elsa Guerdrum Allen – US
Glover Morrill Allen – US
Joel Asaph Allen – US
Robert Porter Allen – US
György Almásy – Hungary/Austria
Bernard Altum – Germany
Dean Amadon – US
George W. Archibald – Canada/US
John Ash – England
Edwin Ashby – Australia
Henry Philemon Attwater – England/Canada/US
Yves Aubry – Canada
Jean Victoire Audouin – France
John James Audubon – France/US
Oliver L. Austin – US

B

Walther Bacmeister – Germany
Alfred Marshall Bailey – US
Florence Augusta Merriam Bailey – US
Jean-Baptiste Bailly – France
Spencer Fullerton Baird – US
E. C. Stuart Baker – England
Russell Balda – US
August Carl Eduard Baldamus – Germany
Jean-Christophe Balouet – France
Vladimir Balthasar – Czech Republic
Betsy Bang – US
Outram Bangs – US
Richard C. Banks – US
David Armitage Bannerman – UK
Phyllis Barclay-Smith – UK
Pierre Barrère – France
Richard Mancliffe Barrington – Ireland
Walter B. Barrows – US
George A. Bartholomew – US
William Bartram – US
Charles Foster Batchelder – US
George Latimer Bates – US
E. V. Baxter – Scotland
Robert Cecil Beavan – England
Johann Matthäus Bechstein – Germany
Rollo Beck – US
Jean-Baptiste Bécœur – France
William Beebe – US
Bruce Beehler – US
William H. Behle – US
Lyman Belding – US
Brian Bell – New Zealand
John Graham Bell – US
Lev Osipovich Belopolsky – USSR
Charles Bendire – US
Constantine Walter Benson – England
Arthur Cleveland Bent – US
Andrew John Berger – US
E. Alexander Bergstrom – US
Hans von Berlepsch – Germany
Grace Berlin – US
Victor Besaucèle – France
Thomas Bewick – England
Valentin Bianchi – Russia
Eugene P. Bicknell – US
Biswamoy Biswas – India
Gladys Black – US
Emmet Reid Blake – US
William Thomas Blanford – England
August Wilhelm Heinrich Blasius – Germany
Johann Heinrich Blasius – Germany
Rudolf Blasius – Germany
Edward Blyth – England
George Augustus Boardman – US/Canada
José Vicente Barbosa du Bocage – Portugal
Pieter Boddaert – Netherlands
Hans von Boetticher – Germany
Nikolay Boev – Bulgaria
Zlatozar Boev – Bulgaria
Friedrich Boie – Germany
Auguste Boissonneau – France
Charles Lucien Bonaparte – France
James Bond – US
Franco Andrea Bonelli – Italy
J. Lewis Bonhote – England (1875–1922)
Bernard Borggreve – Germany
Donald J. Borror – US
Adolphe Boucard – France
Jules Bourcier – France
Frank Swift Bourns – US
Louis Hippolyte Bouteille – France
Johann Friedrich von Brandt – Germany/Russia
Rex Brasher – US
Mark Brazil – England/Japan
Alfred Brehm – Germany
Christian Ludwig Brehm – Germany
Thomas Mayo Brewer – US
William Brewster – US
Mathurin Jacques Brisson – France
Pierce Brodkorb – US
Alan Brooke, 1st Viscount Alanbrooke – England
Allan Brooks – Canada
William Edwin Brooks – Ireland/India
Herbert Brown – US
Nathan Clifford Brown – US
Thomas Browne – England
Carl Friedrich Bruch – Germany
Friedrich Brüggemann – Germany
Morten Thrane Brünnich – Denmark
William Alanson Bryan – US
Henry Bryant – US
Walter Buller – New Zealand
Hermann Burmeister – Germany
Edward H. Burtt Jr. – US
Arthur Lennox Butler – India/England
Edward Arthur Butler – England
Johann Büttikofer – Switzerland/Netherlands/Liberia
Sergei Buturlin – Russia

C

Jean Cabanis – Germany
Hélio Ferraz de Almeida Camargo – Brazil
Archibald James Campbell – Australia
Melbourne Armstrong Carriker – US
John Cassin – US
Montague Chamberlain – Canada/US
James Chapin – US
Frank Chapman – US
Frederick Nutter Chasen – England/Singapore
Robert Ernest Cheesman – England
Tso-hsin Cheng (郑作新) – China
George Kruck Cherrie – US/Costa Rica
John Lewis Childs – US
Glen Chilton – Canada/Australia
Leslie Christidis – Australia
Tadeusz Chrostowski – Poland
Charles Chubb – England
Phillip Clancey – South Africa
Nigel Cleere – England
James Clements – US
Stanley Cobb – US
Herbert L. Coggins – US
Leon Jacob Cole – US
Peter Colston – UK
Herbert Thomas Condon – Australia
Boardman Conover – US
William G. Conway – US
Wells Cooke – US
Charles B. Cory – US
Elliott Coues – US
John Courtney – Australia
Lee Crandall – US
Philipp Jakob Cretzschmar – Germany
Maunsell Crosby – US
Georges Cuvier – France

D

François Marie Daudin – France
Priya Davidar – India
William Leon Dawson – US
William Ryan Dawson – US
Charles Walter De Vis – England/Australia
C. Douglas Deane – UK
Ruthven Deane – US
Côme-Damien Degland – France
Dudley DeGroot – US
Herbert Girton Deignan – US
Jean Théodore Delacour – France/US
Jacques Delamain – France
Adolphe Delattre – France
Georgi Petrovich Dementiev – USSR
Louis Denise – France
Antoon Emeric Marcel De Roo – Belgium
Jean-Marie Derscheid – Belgium
René Louiche Desfontaines – France
Marc Athanase Parfait Œillet des Murs – France
Barbara DeWolfe – US
Douglas Dewar – England
Raol Shri Dharmakumarsinhji – India
Elio Augusto Di Carlo – Italy
Jared Diamond – US
Elizabeth Dickens – US
Donald Ryder Dickey – US
Charles-Eusèbe Dionne – Canada 
John Disney – UK, Australia
Viktor Rafaelyevich Dolnik – USSR/Russia
Janusz Domaniewski – Poland
Caroline Dormon – US
Jean Dorst – France
Henry Eeles Dresser – England
Rudolf Drost – Germany
Alphonse Joseph Charles Dubois – Belgium
Bernard du Bus de Gisignies – Belgium
Charles Dumont de Sainte-Croix – France
Andrzej Dunajewski – Poland
William Dutcher – US
Jonathan Dwight – US
Włodzimierz Dzieduszycki – Poland

E

George Edwards – England, "Father of British ornithology"
Elon Howard Eaton – US
Scott V. Edwards – US
Christian Gottfried Ehrenberg – Germany
Eugene Eisenmann – US
Walter Elmer Ekblaw – US
Carl R. Eklund – US
Daniel Giraud Elliot – US
Carlo von Erlanger – Germany
Arthur Humble Evans – England
Eduard Friedrich Eversmann – Germany
Thomas Campbell Eyton – England

F

Frederik Faber – Denmark
Robert Falla – New Zealand
Donald S. Farner – US
Norman Joseph Favaloro – Australia
Walter Faxon – US
Alan Feduccia – US
Christoph Feldegg – Austria
Frank Finn – England
Otto Finsch – Germany
Gustav Fischer – Germany
Albert Kenrick Fisher – US
James Maxwell McConnell Fisher – England
Kenneth Fisher – England
R. S. R. Fitter – England
John W. Fitzpatrick – US
Jim Flegg – England
James Henry Fleming – Canada
Edward Howe Forbush – US
Joseph Forshaw – Australia
Johann Reinhold Forster – Poland-Lithuania/England
James Franklin – England/India
Louis Fraser – England
Percy Evans Freke – Ireland
Herbert Friedmann – US
Johan Dalgas Frisch – Brazil
János Frivaldszky – Hungary
Louis Agassiz Fuertes – US
Max Fürbringer – Germany

G

Gaszton Gaál – Hungary
Hans Friedrich Gadow – Germany
Joseph Paul Gaimard – France
Tim Gallagher – US
William Gambel – US
Wulf Gatter – Germany 
Heinrich Gaetke – Germany
Prosper Garnot – France
Isidore Geoffroy Saint-Hilaire – France
Zéphirin Gerbe – France
Enrico Hillyer Giglioli – Italy
Frank Gill – US
Theodore Gill – US
Ernest Thomas Gilliard – US
Robert Gillmor – England
Bernard du Bus de Gisignies – Netherlands/Belgium
Nikolai Alekseievich Gladkov – USSR
Constantin Wilhelm Lambert Gloger – Germany
Johann Friedrich Gmelin – Germany
Frederick DuCane Godman – England
Henry Haversham Godwin-Austen – England
Mauricio González-Gordon y Díez – Spain
Derek Goodwin – England
Philip Henry Gosse – England
John Gould – England
Rolf Grantsau – Germany/Brazil
George Robert Gray – England
John Edward Gray (brother of George Robert) – England
Andrew Jackson Grayson – US
James Greenway – US
Edward Grey, 1st Viscount Grey of Fallodon – England
Joseph Grinnell – US
Ludlow Griscom – US
Hermann Grote – Germany
Philippe Guéneau de Montbeillard – France
Johan Ernst Gunnerus – Norway
Jan Willem Boudewijn Gunning – Netherlands/South Africa
John Henry Gurney Jr. – UK
John Henry Gurney Sr. – UK
Eberhard Gwinner – Germany
Nils Carl Gustaf Fersen Gyldenstolpe – Sweden

H

Masauji Hachisuka (蜂須賀正氏) – Japan
Yngvar Hagen – Norway
Pat Hall – England
Bernhard Hantzsch – Germany
Edward Hargitt – Scotland
Herbert Hastings Harington – British India
Edward Harris – US
Colin Harrison – England
Tom Harrisson – Argentina/England
Ernst Hartert – Germany
Gustav Hartlaub – Germany
François Haverschmidt – Netherlands
Arthur Hay, 9th Marquess of Tweeddale (published as Viscount Walden) – Scotland
Helen Hays – US
Cornelis Hazevoet – Netherlands
Gerhard Heilmann – Denmark
Ferdinand Heine – Germany
Bernd Heinrich – US
Katharina Heinroth – Germany
Oskar Heinroth – Germany
Carl Eduard Hellmayr – Austria
Wilhelm Hemprich – Germany
George Morrison Reid Henry – British Ceylon/England
Henry Wetherbee Henshaw – US
James Hepburn – England/Canada
Ottó Herman – Hungary
Johann Hermann – France
Theodor von Heuglin – Germany
Joseph Hickey – US
Warren Billingsley Hitchcock – Australia
John Hobbs – UK/Australia
Brian Houghton Hodgson – England/India
Ralph Hoffmann – US
Carl Peter Holbøll – Denmark
Ajoy Home – India
Richard T. Holmes – US
Jacques Bernard Hombron – France
Alexander von Homeyer – Germany
Eugen Ferdinand von Homeyer – Germany
Andries Hoogerwerf – Netherlands
Milton N. Hopkins – US
Thomas Horsfield – US
Henry Eliot Howard – England
William Henry Hudson – Argentina/England
Allan Octavian Hume – England/India
Rob Hume – England
Syed Abdulla Hussain – India
Frederick Hutton – England/New Zealand

I

Johann Karl Wilhelm Illiger – Germany
Collingwood Ingram – England
Tom Iredale – UK/Australia
Hussein Adan Isack – Kenya
Yuri Andreyevich Isakov – Russia/USSR

J

Pierre Jabouille – France
Frederick John Jackson – England/Uganda
Honoré Jacquinot – France
Helen F. James – US
Sir William Jardine, 7th Baronet – Scotland
Konstanty Jelski – Poland
Thomas C. Jerdon – England/India
Herbert K. Job – US
Hans Johansen – Russia/Denmark
Hermann Johansen – Russia
Richard F. Johnston – US
Lynds Jones – US
Christian Jouanin – France
Henri Jouard – France
George Junge – Netherlands

K

Peter Kaestner – US
Gisela Kaplan – Australia
Johann Jakob Kaup – Germany
Janet Kear – England
Charles Keeler – US
John Gerrard Keulemans – Netherlands
Charles Rollin Keyes – US
Alexander Keyserling – Germany
Lavkumar Khachar – India
Norman Boyd Kinnear – Scotland
Jared Kirtland – US
Heinrich von Kittlitz – Germany
Niels Kjærbølling – Denmark
Otto Kleinschmidt – Germany
C. Boden Kloss – England/Malaya
Walter Koelz – US
Alexander Koenig – Germany
Maria Koepcke – Peru
Paul Robert Kollibay – Prussia
Elizabeth Kozlova – Russia
Niels Krabbe – Denmark
K. S. R. Krishna Raju – India
Heinrich Kuhl – Germany
Hans Kummerlöwe (or Kumerloeve after World War II) – Germany
Nagahisa Kuroda (黒田長久) – Japan
Nagamichi Kuroda (黒田長礼) – Japan
Sayako Kuroda (黒田清子) – Japan

L

David Lack – England
Elizabeth Lack – England
Frédéric de Lafresnaye – France
Christian Ludwig Landbeck – Germany
Bill Lane – Australia
Amelia Laskey – US
John Latham – England
Alfred Laubmann – Germany
Louis Lavauden – France
George Newbold Lawrence – US
Edgar Leopold Layard – England/Ceylon
Dudley Le Souef – Australia
Elsie P. Leach – England
William Elford Leach – England
John Legg – England
William Vincent Legge – Australia
Johann Philipp Achilles Leisler – Germany
Boonsong Lekagul – Thailand
Jean-Baptiste Leschenault de La Tour – France
René Lesson – France
François Levaillant – France
Graceanna Lewis – US
Félix Louis L'Herminier – France
Hinrich Lichtenstein – Germany
Karl Theodor Liebe – Germany
Carl Linnaeus – Swedish
Thomas Littleton Powys, 4th Baron Lilford – England
Bradley C. Livezey – US
Victor Loche – France
Hans Löhrl – Germany
Konrad Lorenz – Austria
Harald von Loudon – Germany
Michel Louette – Belgium
Herman L. Løvenskiold – Norway
Percy Lowe – England
George Lowery – US
Oskar Engelhard von Löwis of Menar – Latvia/Germany/Russia
Hubert Lynes – Wales/England

M

James Macdonald – Scotland/Australia
William MacGillivray – Scotland
Cyril Mackworth-Praed – England
Gyula Madarász – Austria-Hungary
Wolfgang Makatsch – Germany
Alexey Sergeevich Malchevsky – Russia
Alfred Malherbe – France
Louis Mandelli – Italy, India
Saverio Manetti – Italy
Stephen Marchant – Australia
Charles Henry Tilson Marshall – England/India
Kathy Martin – Canada
Ian J. Mason – Australia
George Masters – Australia
Gregory Mathews – Australia
Ernst Mayr – US
George A. McCall – US
Elliott McClure – US/Southeast Asia
John Porter McCown – US
Allan Reginald McEvey – Australia
Edward Avery McIlhenny – US
Thomas McIlwraith – Canada
Charles McKay – US
Chris Mead – England
Edgar Alexander Mearns – US
Gerlof Mees – Netherlands
M.F.M. Meiklejohn – England
Annie Meinertzhagen – Scotland
Richard Meinertzhagen – England
Wilhelm Meise – Germany
Mikhail Aleksandrovich Menzbier – Russia
Christopher Merret – England
C. Hart Merriam – US
Olivier Messiaen – France
Adolf Bernhard Meyer – Germany
Rodolphe Meyer de Schauensee – US
Alden H. Miller – US
Alexander William Milligan – Australia
Alphonse Milne-Edwards – France
Clive Minton – Australia
Lacy Irvine Moffett – US
Juan Ignacio Molina – Chile
Edgardo Moltoni – Italy
Burt Monroe – US
George Montagu – England
John J. Montgomery – US
Frederic Moore – England
Robert Thomas Moore – US
Reginald Ernest Moreau – England
Hans Christian Cornelius Mortensen – Denmark
Guy Mountfort – England
Philipp Ludwig Statius Müller – Germany
Salomon Müller – Germany
Étienne Mulsant – France
Robert Cushman Murphy – US
Durno Murray – Australia

N

Johann Natterer – Austria
Johann Friedrich Naumann – Germany
René de Naurois – France
K. K. Neelakantan – India
Adolph Nehrkorn – Germany
Henry Nehrling – US
Edward William Nelson – US
Thomas Hudson Nelson – England
Oscar Neumann – Germany
Oliver Michael Griffiths Newman – Australia
Alfred Newton – England
Edward Newton – England
Ian Newton – England
Margaret Morse Nice – US
Michael John Nicoll – UK/Egypt
John Treadwell Nichols – US
Max Nicholson – England
Günther Niethammer – Germany
Alexander von Nordmann – Finland
Alfred John North – Australia
Cornelius Nozeman – Netherlands

O

Eugene W. Oates – England/Burma
Harry C. Oberholser – US
Bill Oddie – England
William Robert Ogilvie-Grant – Scotland
Claes Christian Olrog – Sweden/Argentina
Storrs L. Olson – US
Eduard Daniël van Oort – Netherlands
Alcide d'Orbigny – France
George Ord – US
Gordon Orians – US
Wilfred Hudson Osgood – US
Émile Oustalet – France

P

Peter Simon Pallas – Germany
Shane A. Parker – England/Australia
Theodore A. Parker III – US
Kenneth Carroll Parkes – US
Carl Parrot – Germany
Titian Peale – US
Thomas Gilbert Pearson – US
August von Pelzeln – Austria
Thomas Pennant – Wales
James Lee Peters – US
Wilhelm Peters – Germany
Roger Tory Peterson – US
Sewall Pettingill – US
William Henry Phelps – US/Venezuela
William H. Phelps Jr. – Venezuela
Rodolfo Amando Philippi – Germany/Chile
Allan Robert Phillips – US
John Charles Phillips – US
Olivério Pinto – Brazil
Frank Pitelka – US
Graham Pizzey – Australia
Sally Poncet – Australia
Pilai Poonswad – Thailand
John du Pont – US
Leonid Aleksandrovich Portenko – USSR(Ukraine) 
Harold Douglas Pratt Jr. – US
Josef Prokop Pražák – Bohemia
Alexandre Prigogine – Belgium
Aleksandr Promptov – Russia/USSR
Nikolay Przhevalsky (or Przewalski) – Russia
Jacques Pucheran – France

Q

Jean René Constant Quoy – France
Vo Quy – Vietnam

R

Dioscoro S. Rabor – Philippines
Stamford Raffles – England/Singapore
Edward Pierson Ramsay – Australia
Austin L. Rand – Canada
Pamela C. Rasmussen – US
Sushma Reddy – India/US 
Ludwig Reichenbach – Germany
Anton Reichenow – Germany
Pauline Reilly – Australia
Bernhard Rensch – Germany
John Richardson – Scotland/England
Charles Wallace Richmond – US
Robert S. Ridgely – US
John Livzey Ridgway – US
Robert Ridgway – US
Joseph Harvey Riley – US
Leonora Jeffrey Rintoul – Scotland
Sidney Dillon Ripley – US
Robert Ritter von Dombrowski – Bohemia/Romania
Chandler Robbins – US
Austin Roberts – South Africa
Thomas Sadler Roberts – US
Herbert C. Robinson – England/Malaya
Edward Hearle Rodd – England
Theodore Roosevelt – US
Hermann von Rosenberg – Germany
Adriaan Joseph van Rossem – US
Walter Rothschild, 2nd Baron Rothschild – England
Frank Rozendaal – Netherlands
Eduard Rüppell – Germany
Karl Russ – Germany(Prussia)
Erich Rutschke – Germany
Wladyslaw Rydzewski – Poland

S

Edward Sabine – Ireland
John Hall Sage – US
Finn Salomonsen – Denmark
Tommaso Salvadori – Italy
Osbert Salvin – England
Howard Saunders – England
William Edwin Saunders – Canada
William Savage – US
Paolo Savi – Italy
Hans Schaanning – Norway
Alfred Schifferli – Switzerland
Eiler Lehn Schiøler – Denmark
Hermann Schlegel – Germany/Netherlands
Richard Schodde – Australia
Ernst Schüz – Germany
Philip Sclater – England
William Lutley Sclater – England
Giovanni Antonio Scopoli – Austria/Tyrol
J. Michael Scott – US
Peter Scott – England
Henry Seebohm – England
Josef Seilern – Austria/Czech
Prideaux John Selby – England
George B. Sennett – US
Pavel Vladimirovich Serebrovsky – Russia/USSR
William Serle – Scotland
Nikolai Alekseevich Severtzov (or Severtsov) – Russia
Richard Bowdler Sharpe – England
George Shaw – England
Frederick H. Sheldon – US
George Ernest Shelley – England
Althea Sherman – US
Hadoram Shirihai – Israel
Lester L. Short – US
Charles Sibley – US
David Allen Sibley – US
Helmut Sick – Brazil
Hendrik Cornelis Siebers – Netherlands
Eugène Simon – French
Ken Simpson – Australia
Vasily Nikolaevich Skalon – Russia/USSR
Cuthbert John Skead – South Africa
Alexander Skutch – US
Tore Slagsvold – Norway
Andrew Smith – Scotland
Edward Smith-Stanley, 13th Earl of Derby – England
Bertram E. Smythies – England
Emilie Snethlage – Germany/Brazil
David Snow – England
Barbara Snow – England
Jan Sokolowski – Poland
James Mortimer Southwick – US
Evgeni Pavlovich Spangenberg – USSR
Anders Erikson Sparrman – Sweden
Johann Baptist von Spix – Germany
Isaac Sprague – US
Don Stap – US
David Steadman – US
Joseph Beal Steere – US
Boris K. Stegmann – Russia/USSR
Joachim Steinbacher – Germany
Leonhard Stejneger – Norway – US
Georg Steller – Germany
Leo Stepanyan – USSR/Armenia
James Francis Stephens – England
Ferdinand Stoliczka – Czech Republic
Witmer Stone – US
Robert W. Storer – US
Erwin Stresemann – Germany
Hugh Edwin Strickland – England
Robert Stroud – US
Noah Strycker – US
Jacob H. Studer – US
Johann Heinrich Christian Friedrich Sturm – Germany
Johann Wilhelm Sturm – Germany
J. Denis Summers-Smith – Scotland/England
Carl Jakob Sundevall – Sweden
Petr Sushkin – Russia
Ernst Sutter – Switzerland
George Miksch Sutton – US
William Swainson – England/New Zealand
Charles Swinhoe – England/India
Robert Swinhoe – England/Formosa
William Henry Sykes – England/India
Jan Sztolcman (also as Jean Stolzmann) – Poland

T

Władysław Taczanowski – Poland
Coenraad Jacob Temminck – Netherlands
John Kenneth Terres – US
Gerhard Thielcke – Germany
Johannes Thienemann – Germany
Ludwig Thienemann – Germany
William Lay Thompson – US
Arthur Landsborough Thomson – Scotland
Claud B. Ticehurst – England
Samuel Tickell – India
Luuk Tinbergen – Netherlands
Niko Tinbergen – Netherlands
Friedrich Tischler – Prussia/Germany
Walter Edmond Clyde Todd – US
John David Digues La Touche – England/Ireland
Charles Haskins Townsend – US
John Kirk Townsend – US
Melvin Alvah Traylor Jr. – US
Alberto O. Treganza – US
Roland Trimen – England/South Africa
Henry Baker Tristram – England
Johann Jakob von Tschudi – Switzerland
Viktor von Tschusi zu Schmidhoffen – Austria
Bernard Tucker – England
Marmaduke Tunstall – England
William Turner – England
Konstanty Tyzenhauz – Poland

U

Miklós Udvardy – Hungary/Canada 
Tatsuo Utagawa (宇田川竜男) – Japan

V

Dirk Van den Abeele – Belgium
Jacques Van Impe – Belgium
Victor Van Someren – Australia/Kenya
Josselyn Van Tyne – US
Charles Vaurie – France/US
Édouard Verreaux – France
Jules Verreaux – France
Louis Jean Pierre Vieillot – France
Nicholas Aylward Vigors – Ireland/England
Keith Vinicombe – England
William Vogt – US
Karel Voous – Netherlands

W

Johann Georg Wagler – Germany
Will Wagstaff – Wales/England
Veleslav Wahl – Czechoslovakia 
Johan August Wahlberg – Sweden
Lawrence H. Walkinshaw – US
Alfred Russel Wallace – England
Robert George Wardlaw-Ramsay – England
George Waterston – Scotland
Richard Weatherly – Australia
Hugo Weigold – Germany
Alexander Wetmore – US
Hugh Whistler – India
Joseph Whitaker – Italy/England
Gilbert White – England
Henry Luke White – Australia
Otto Widmann – US
Maximilian of Wied-Neuwied – Germany
John Wiens – US
Lionel William Wiglesworth – England
Iolo Williams – Wales
Francis Willughby – UK
Alexander Wilson – Scotland/US
Kerry-Jayne Wilson – NZ
Scott Barchard Wilson – England
Marie Winn – US
Harry Witherby – England
Kazimierz Wodzicki – Poland/New Zealand
Hans Edmund Wolters – Germany
Won Hong-gu, 원홍구 – North Korea (father of Won Pyong-oh)
Won Pyong-oh, 원병오 – South Korea
Samuel Washington Woodhouse – US
John Woinarski – Australia
Dean Conant Worcester – US
Philogène Wytsman – Belgium

X

John Xantus – Hungary

Y

Yoshimaro Yamashina (山階芳麿) – Japan
William Yarrell – England
John Yealland – England

Z

Nikolai Alekseyvich Zarudny – Ukraine/Russia
John Todd Zimmer – US
Giuseppe Zinanni – Italy

See also
List of ornithologists abbreviated names
List of birdwatchers

References

External links
http://www.zoonomen.net/bio/ind.html

List
Ornithologists
Ornithologists